In chemistry and biochemistry, an oligomer is a molecule that consists of a few repeating units which could be derived, actually or conceptually, from smaller molecules, monomers.  The name is composed of Greek elements oligo-, "a few" and -mer, "parts".  An adjective form is oligomeric.  

The oligomer concept is contrasted to that of a polymer, which is usually understood to have a large number of units, possibly thousands or millions. However, there is no sharp distinction between these two concepts. One proposed criterion is whether the molecule's properties vary significantly with the removal of one or a few of the units. 

An oligomer with a specific number of units is referred to by the Greek prefix denoting that number, with the ending -mer: thus dimer, trimer, tetramer, pentamer, and hexamer refer to molecules with two, three, four, five, and six units, respectively. If the units are identical, one has a homo-oligomer;  otherwise one may use hetero-oligomer. An example of a homo-oligomeric protein is collagen, which is composed of three identical protein chains. 

Some biologically important oligomers are macromolecules like proteins or nucleic acids; for instance, hemoglobin is a protein tetramer. An oligomer of amino acids is called an oligopeptide or just a peptide. An oligosaccharide is an oligomer of monosaccharides (simple sugars). An oligonucleotide is a short single-stranded fragment of nucleic acid such as DNA or RNA, or similar fragments of analogs of nucleic acids such as peptide nucleic acid or Morpholinos.

The units of an oligomer may be connected by covalent bonds, which may result from bond rearrangement or condensation reactions, or by weaker forces such as hydrogen bonds.

The term multimer is used in biochemistry for oligomers of proteins that are not covalently bound. The major capsid protein VP1 that comprises the shell of the polio virus is a self-assembling multimer of 72 pentamers held together by local electric charges.

Many oils are oligomeric, such as liquid paraffin. Plasticizers are oligomeric esters widely used to soften thermoplastics such as PVC. They may be made from monomers by linking them together, or by separation from the higher fractions of crude oil. Polybutene is an oligomeric oil used to make putty. 

Oligomerization is a chemical process that converts monomers to macromolecular complexes through a finite degree of polymerization. Telomerization is an oligomerization carried out under conditions that result in chain transfer, limiting the size of the oligomers. (This concept is not to be confused with the formation of a telomere, a region of highly repetitive DNA at the end of a chromosome.)

Green oil
In the oil and gas industry, green oil refers to oligomers formed in all C2, C3, and C4 hydrogenation reactors of ethylene plants and other petrochemical production facilities; it is a mixture of C4 to C20 unsaturated and reactive components with about 90% aliphatic dienes and 10% of alkanes plus alkenes. Different heterogeneous and homogeneous catalysts are operative in producing green oils via the oligomerization of alkenes.

See also
 GPCR oligomer
 Oligomery (botany)
 Protein oligomer

References

External links

Polymer chemistry